The women's 4 × 400 metres relay event at the 2011 All-Africa Games was held on 15 September 2011.

Results

References
Results
Results

Relay
2011 in women's athletics